Patrick Mölzl (born 28 December 1980) is a German former football coach and former player who played as a midfielder.

Coaching career
On 28 February 2019, Mölzl was appointed assistant manager to newly hired manager Cristian Fiél at Dynamo Dresden, signing a deal until the end of the season. The deal was later extended until the summer 2021. On 2 December 2019, Fiél and his staff, including Mölzl, was fired.

Personal life
Mölzl is the son of Erhan Önal, formerly of Bayern Munich and the first Turkish immigrant to play in the Bundesliga.

References

External links
 

1980 births
Living people
German people of Turkish descent
German footballers
Footballers from Munich
Association football midfielders
FC Bayern Munich II players
SpVgg Greuther Fürth players
FC St. Pauli players
FC Augsburg players
FC Ingolstadt 04 players
FC Ingolstadt 04 II players
2. Bundesliga players
3. Liga players